Tina Parekh is an Indian Television actress and voice actress. She is best known for her roles as Shruti Om Agarwal in Kahaani Ghar Ghar Kii, as Mukti Deshmukh in Kasautii Zindagii Kay and as Melissa in Khichdi and Instant Khichdi. She played Mihir Mishra's mom in the commercial advertisement of BSNL B-fone.

Filmography

Television

Dubbing roles

Live action films

Awards
 Indian Telly Award 2006 Best Actress in Supporting Role - Kasautii Zindagii Kay
 Sinsui TV Award 2006 Best Actress in Supporting Role - Kasautii Zindagii Kay

References

External links
 

20th-century Indian actresses
Indian television actresses
Indian film actresses
Female models from Rajasthan
Indian women television presenters
Indian television presenters
Indian voice actresses
Living people
Actresses from Jaipur
Year of birth missing (living people)
Actresses in Hindi television